Edgar Davis (October 7, 1873 – April 23, 1927) was an American golfer. He competed in the men's individual event at the 1904 Summer Olympics.

References

1873 births
1927 deaths
Amateur golfers
American male golfers
Olympic golfers of the United States
Golfers at the 1904 Summer Olympics
People from Alton, Illinois
Sportspeople from Illinois